William Hanna Clarke (1882–1924) was a dentist, then an artist, from Glasgow, Scotland. Clarke lived, worked as an artist, died and is buried in Kirkcudbright, Scotland.

Clarke was a Landscape and figure painter and many of his works featured Kirkcudbright. He is buried in the town's churchyard and his tombstone was carved by friend, Glasgow sculptor, Alexander Proudfoot.

References
 The Daily Record, 18 June 2010

20th-century Scottish painters
Scottish male painters
1882 births
1924 deaths
20th-century Scottish male artists